The life simulation video game series Animal Crossing, created by Katsuya Eguchi and first released in 2001 by Nintendo, features an assortment of recurring characters. Titles in the series follow the player character as they live in a village populated by anthropomorphic animals, with gameplay that proceeds in a nonlinear fashion and in-game events that occur in real-time. As of Animal Crossing: New Horizons, the most recent release in the series, there are over 400 animal characters that can potentially populate a player's village. In addition to these villager characters, Animal Crossing features characters that appear in the villages of all players; these characters typically serve a particular gameplay function, or appear at a specific in-game event.

Characters

Introduced in Animal Forest and Animal Crossing
 was released for the Nintendo 64 in 2001 exclusively in Japan. An enhanced remake of the game for GameCube was released as Animal Forest+ in Japan, and as Animal Crossing worldwide. The games introduce many of the series' core recurring characters, notably businessman Tom Nook, traveling musician K.K. Slider, and Mr. Resetti, who lectures the player if they reset the game.

Introduced in Animal Crossing: Wild World
Animal Crossing: Wild World was released on the Nintendo DS in 2005.

Introduced in Animal Crossing: City Folk
Animal Crossing: City Folk was released on the Wii in 2008.

Introduced in Animal Crossing: New Leaf
Animal Crossing: New Leaf was released on the Nintendo 3DS in 2012. The game introduces Isabelle, a secretary at the town hall who has been described as a "fan-favorite" and a mascot of the Animal Crossing series. Additional content and characters were added to the game in Animal Crossing: New Leaf – Welcome Amiibo, a free update for the game released in late 2016.

Introduced in Animal Crossing: New Horizons
Animal Crossing: New Horizons was released on the Nintendo Switch on March 20, 2020. Certain characters introduced in previous Animal Crossing titles were not present in the game at launch, but have been added through free downloadable content (DLC) updates. Other characters were added in Animal Crossing: New Horizons – Happy Home Paradise, a paid DLC update slated for release on November 5, 2021.

Introduced in spin-off titles
Several spin-off Animal Crossing series titles have been produced, which feature their own original characters.

Appearances by title

Notes

References

External links
 
 List of villager characters at Nookipedia

 
Animal Crossing